Scene of the Crime is a mystery anthology series that aired in 1991 and 1992 on CBS, as part of the Crimetime After Primetime late-night block.  Rather than employing different actors each episode, the program had a regular cast who played different characters in each story.  The series was produced in Vancouver, British Columbia, Canada, and series regulars included Canadian character actors Stephen McHattie and Kim Coates, and producer Stephen J. Cannell appeared onscreen to introduce each story as the show's host.

Series overview

Repertory company
 Teri Austin
 Kim Coates (season 1)
 Lisa Houle
 Stephen McHattie
 Maxine Miller
 Francois Montagut
 Sandra Nelson
 Robert Paisley
 Barbara Parkins (season 1)
 Olivier Pierre
 George Touliatos

References

External links

1991 American television series debuts
1992 American television series endings
1990s American crime drama television series
1990s American anthology television series
1990s American mystery television series
CBS original programming
Television series by Stephen J. Cannell Productions
Television series by 20th Century Fox Television
English-language television shows
Television series created by Stephen J. Cannell